Port Elizabeth City F.C. was a South African soccer club, active in the 1960s and 1970s, which won the National Football League in 1967.

References

National Football League (South Africa) clubs
Defunct soccer clubs in South Africa